The Courier is a 1988 British-Irish action crime thriller film directed by Frank Deasy and Joe Lee and starring Padraig O'Loinsigh, Cait O'Riordan, Ian Bannen, Patrick Bergin, Andrew Connolly and Gabriel Byrne.

Cast
Padraig O'Loinsigh as Mark
Cait O'Riordan as Colette
Gabriel Byrne as Val
Ian Bannen as McGuigan
Patrick Bergin as Christy
Andrew Connolly as Danny
Michelle Houlden as Sharon
Joe Savino as Video Editor

References

External links
 
 

1988 multilingual films
English-language Irish films
Irish-language films
British action thriller films
British crime thriller films
Irish crime thriller films
Irish action films
Palace Pictures films
Vestron Pictures films
1980s English-language films
British multilingual films
Irish multilingual films
1980s British films